Gabriel Bullet (22 March 1921 – 7 September 2011) was a Swiss prelate of the Roman Catholic Church.

Bullet was born in Estavayer-le-Lac, Switzerland and was ordained a priest on 8 July 1945. Bullet was appointed auxiliary bishop of the Diocese of Lausanne, Geneva and Fribourg on 29 December 1970 as well as titular bishop of Glavinitza and ordained bishop on 6 February 1971. Bullet resigned from the diocese on 16 November 1993. Until his death, Bullet held the title of Titular Bishop of Glavinitza.

References

External links
Diocese of Lausanne, Geneva and Fribourg website (French)
 Obituary Gabriel Bullet (German)

20th-century Roman Catholic bishops in Switzerland
1921 births
2011 deaths